Dušan Žovinec (born October 5, 1992) is a Czech professional ice hockey player. He played with HC Sparta Praha in the Czech Extraliga during the 2010–11 Czech Extraliga postseason.

References

External links

1992 births
Czech ice hockey defencemen
HC Sparta Praha players
Living people
Ice hockey people from Prague